Petrus Haraseb (born 1 June 1968) is a retired Namibian footballer. He competed for the Namibia national football team from 1992-1998, including the 1998 African Cup of Nations. He played for Liverpool Okahandja. He played as a defender.

References

1968 births
Living people
Namibia international footballers
Namibian men's footballers
1998 African Cup of Nations players
Namibia Premier League players

Association football defenders